Eldred is a given name and may refer to:

Eldred Byerly or Bud Byerly "Bud" Byerly (1920–2012), American professional baseball pitcher
Eldred Hallas (1870–1926), British politician, MP for Birmingham Duddeston from 1918 to 1922
Eldred Hawken (born 1989), South African cricketer
Eldred Henry (born 1994), athlete from the British Virgin Islands competing in the shot put and discus throw
Merritt Eldred Hoag (1909–1994), lieutenant commander in the U.S. Navy during World War II
David Eldred Holt (1843–1925), Episcopalian clergy
Eldred D. Jones (1925–2020), Sierra Leonean academic, writer and literary critic
Eldred Kraemer (1929–1992), American football guard
Drew Eldred Nixon or Drew Nixon (born 1959), former Republican Texas state senator from 1995 to 2001
Eldred Norman (1914–1971), Australian inventor and racing-car driver
Eldred Gregory Peck (1916–2003), American actor and popular film star from the 1940s to the 1960s
Eldred Pottinger (1811–1843), Anglo-Indian army officer and diplomat
Eldred Simkins (1779–1831), U.S. Representative from South Carolina
Eldred G. Smith (1907–2013), patriarch to the LDS Church from 1947 to 1979
Eldred Stebbing MNZM (1921–2009), New Zealand record label owner, co-founder of the Zodiac Records label
Eldred Tabachnik, QC (born 1943), South African-born English barrister, recorder and a former president of the Board of Deputies of British Jews
Eldred Nathaniel Woodcock, hunter and trapper of Potter County, Pennsylvania